Clausen is a quarter in central Luxembourg City, in southern Luxembourg. Clausen is one of the oldest neighbourhoods in the city of Luxembourg with its earlier history tying back to that of the breweries in the area during the 12th century. It is now a hot spot for nightlife with a number of trendy bars and restaurants.

, the quarter has a population of 989 inhabitants, of whom 26.41% possessed Luxembourgish nationality, and 73.59% were of other nationalities.

Its parish church, St. Cunegonde, is the location for Luxembourg's weekly celebration of Tridentine Mass on Sundays at 11.30 a.m. as of 5 October 2014.

The church has a number of notable wall paintings depicting the life of St. Cunegonde.

Notable former residents
The statesman and one of the founding fathers of the EU, Robert Schuman, was born in a property rented by his parents on rue Jules Wilhelm within the quarter. He later attended the local primary school. In 1985 the house was purchased by the state and is now home to a small research institute.  The baptismal font used for his baptism into the Catholic church may be found in the local parish church of St. Cunegonde where an image in his boyhood likeness may also be found on a large wall painting to the left of the altar depicting an event in the life of St. Cunegonde. The artist used local people as models for a crowd scene  and the young Robert Schuman was used to represent a small boy.

References

Quarters of Luxembourg City